Kyaw Tin (born 31 October 1955) is former union minister for International Cooperation of Myanmar. He also served as deputy minister of Foreign Affairs under Aung San Suu Kyi. As of November 2021, Kyaw Tin continued to be recognized by ASEAN as Myanmar's foreign minister.

Early life and education 
Kyaw Tin was born on 31 October 1955 in Wuntho of Sagaing Division. He graduated with a masters degree with Mathematics from Yangon University and earned his post-graduate diploma in environmental management from Dresden University of Technology in Germany.

Career

Foreign affairs 
Kyaw Tin served in the foreign affairs services for approximately 30 years.

Minister 
Kyaw Tin became the deputy minister of Foreign Affairs under Aung San Suu Kyi.In April 2016, Aung San Suu Kyi hold the post, State Counsellor.So she can't attend to some foreign ministers meetings. Kyaw Tin attended to the Foreign Meetings as deputy minister of Foreign Affairs.In 2017, Htin Kyaw formed the new ministry, International Cooperation and appointed Kyaw Tin as union minister.Since then Kyaw Tin attended to foreign ministers meetings as minister of International Cooperation.

In the aftermath of the military-led 2021 Myanmar coup d'état, the Tatmadaw appointed Ko Ko Hlaing as Kyaw Tin's successor for International Cooperation minister on 1 February 2021.

References 

Burmese diplomats
Permanent Representatives of Myanmar to the United Nations
Foreign ministers of Myanmar
1955 births
Living people